The Lutier was a French automobile manufactured only in 1907; the provenance of the four-cylinder car is unknown.

References
David Burgess Wise, The New Illustrated Encyclopedia of Automobiles

Defunct motor vehicle manufacturers of France